Nela Lopušanová (born 26 February 2008) is a Slovak ice hockey player, a winger, currently playing in the Slovak premier under-16 league, the , with the U16 team of VLCI Žilina and in the Slovak Women's Extraliga with MsHKM Žilina ženy. She gained the attention of the international ice hockey community at age fourteen with her remarkable performance at the 2023 IIHF Ice Hockey U18 Women's World Championship, which included scoring the first Michigan goal at an IIHF women's event.

Lopušanová also plays elite ball hockey and is a member of the Slovak women's national ball hockey team.

Ice hockey career
Lopušanová began figure skating on an outdoor pond at the age of two and started playing ice hockey before her fifth birthday. At the age of four, she attended a World Girls Ice Hockey Weekend hosted by the IIHF, prompting her to join a club team. She developed with MsHKM Žilina, the minor and junior affiliate of VLCI Žilina, in her hometown of Žilina. 

Across three games with MHK Dolný Kubín U16, she scored a goal and 2 assists for a point-per-game pace.

In the 2022–23 campaign, she continued to build on her incredible scoring from the previous season. In the final game of the session against Ice Dream Košice, she contributed to her team's landslide 24–1 win with 10 goals and 9 assists.

Her stellar performance led VLCI Žilina youth coach Jakub Kubiš to dub her "a wunderkind of the kind that is born only once per century."

International play

Ice hockey
Lopušanová debuted with the Slovak national under-18 team at the 2023 IIHF Ice Hockey U18 Women's World Championship in Östersund, Sweden. At just fourteen years of age, she was among the youngest players at the tournament – only seven other players were born in 2008 and three of the seven were her teammates (Lenka Karkošková, Alica Juríková, and Lívia Nogová). 

In Slovakia’s first game, she scored two goals and notched an assist against Japan to lead all skaters in scoring at the conclusion of games played on the opening day of the tournament. Having grabbed international media attention in her first game, Lopušanová followed it up with "one of the most dominant performances ever seen by a player her age" in Slovakia’s game against Switzerland, scoring a hat-trick and an assist in the eventual 4–1 win. She scored a goal and notched an assist in the third game against Czechia. In the quarterfinal game against Sweden, she became the first player to score a Michigan goal at a women's IIHF event, recording Slovakia's sole goal of the game. 

With nine goals and twelve points, Lopušanová was the top point producer of the tournament. In recognition of her astonishing debut, the tournament directorate selected her as Best Forward and she was named a Media All Star as well as tournament MVP by the press, despite Slovakia's sixth-place finish.

During the Friuli-Venezia Giulia 2023 edition of the European Youth Olympic Festival (EYOF), Lopušanová again led the tournament in scoring, propelling Slovakia to a silver medal.

Ball hockey
Lopušanová also plays elite ball hockey and made her debut with the Slovak national team at the 2022 Ball Hockey World Championship, at which Slovakia claimed the bronze medal. She led all Slovak players with 10 points in seven games, including three game winning goals and a hat-trick, and was named a tournament All Star.

Personal life
Lopušanová was born on 26 February 2008 in the Strážov district of Žilina, Slovakia to parents Jozef Lopušan and Slávka Lopušanová. Her older brother, Šimon Lopušan (born 2002), is also an ice hockey player, a right winger, who  with the men's senior team of Vlci Žilina in the Slovenská hokejová liga.

A self-proclaimed "hockey fanatic," she devotes nearly all her free time to the game.

Lopušanová has indicated she would like to attend university in North America and play in the NCAA. 

In March 2023, it was announced she will begin attending Bishop Kerney High School in Irondequoit, New York and playing with the Bishop Kearney Selects women's under-19 ice hockey team in August 2023.

Career statistics

Regular season and playoffs 

Source: Hockey Slovakia

International

Awards and honors

Ice hockey

Ball hockey

References

External links
 
 Nela Lopušanová at Hockey Slovakia 

2008 births
Living people
Ball hockey players
Slovak women's ice hockey forwards
Sportspeople from Žilina